The 1936 Open Championship was the 71st Open Championship, held 25–27 June at Royal Liverpool Golf Club in Hoylake, England. Alf Padgham won his only major title, one stroke ahead of runner-up Jimmy Adams.

Qualifying was scheduled for 22–23 June, Monday and Tuesday, with 18 holes at Royal Liverpool and 18 holes at Wallasey, and the top 100 and ties qualified. All the scores were voided; Henry Cotton had completed his round of 67 at Wallasey before play was abandoned. Tuesday proceeded as scheduled and the Monday round was played on Wednesday. Cotton led the qualifiers on 139, having scored 68 at Wallasey on the rearranged day, with Wally Smithers two shots behind on 141; the qualifying score was 155 and 107 players advanced. With the weather delay, the championship began on Thursday and concluded with two rounds on Saturday.

After the second round on Friday, Bill Cox and Adams were tied for the lead, with five players a shot back, including Padgham and Henry Cotton. The 36-hole cut was the top sixty and ties; it was at 156 (+8) and 62 advanced.

After the third round on Saturday morning, Adams and Cotton shared the lead, with Padgham and Tom Green a stroke behind. In the final round that afternoon, Padgham tied Adams for the lead at the turn. He made a four on the 17th, then made a 15-footer (4.5 m) for a three at the 18th to post a 287 total. Adams stood on the 17th knowing that he needed to play the last two holes in eight strokes to tie Padgham. His approach shot found a greenside bunker, and after he failed to get up-and-down he now needed a three on the 18th. He found the green in two, but his  putt lipped out and he finished a stroke behind Padgham. Cotton and Green were still on the course, but neither could mount a charge, giving Padgham the championship.

Future four-time Open champion Bobby Locke tied for eighth in his major championship debut. Jim Ferrier, the winner of the PGA Championship in 1947, also played in his first major and finished 44th. Both were among the eleven amateurs to make the cut, with Locke as low amateur.

Past champions in the field 

Source:

All past champions in the field made the cut.

Did not advance past qualifying rounds (Tuesday & Wednesday):
George Duncan (1920) 157, Ted Ray (1912) 157,James Braid (1901, 1905, 1906, 1908, 1910) 163, Sandy Herd (1902) 164.

Did not enter:
 Denny Shute (1933), Tommy Armour (1931), Bobby Jones (1926, 1927, 1930),Walter Hagen (1922, 1924, 1928, 1929), Jim Barnes (1925).

Course

Round summaries

First round
Thursday, 25 June 1936

Source:

Second round
Friday, 26 June 1936

Source:

Third round
Saturday, 27 June 1936 (morning)

Source:

Final round
Saturday, 27 June 1936 (afternoon)

Source:

Amateurs: Locke (−2), Thomson (+3), Francis (+6), McLean (+10), Ferrier (+14), Flaherty (+14),Woollam (+14), Roberts (+15), Pennink (+16), Timmis (+17), Walker (+18)

References

External links
Royal Liverpool 1936 (Official site)
1936 Open Championship (GolfCompendium.com)

The Open Championship
Golf tournaments in England
Sport in the Metropolitan Borough of Wirral
Open Championship
Open Championship
Open Championship